Berrechid is a town and municipality in Berrechid Province of the Casablanca-Settat region of Morocco. It recorded a population of 136,634 inhabitants in the 2014 Moroccan census. At the time of the 2004 census, the commune had a total population of 89,830 people living in 18,808 households.

References

Populated places in Berrechid Province
Municipalities of Morocco
Berrechid